James Lamont & Co was a shipbuilder and ship-repairer on the Clyde.

History
James Lamont & Co were established as a ship repairer at East India Harbour, Greenock, in 1870. After the collapse of the Clyde Shipbuilding Co, Lamonts purchased the Castle Yard at Port Glasgow in 1929. They did not build ships there until 1938, reverting to repairs during the war and becoming a full shipyard again once hostilities were over.

In 1979 the company announced that it was to give up shipbuilding and concentrate on repair work, which had been expanded by the opening of a 113m dry-dock in 1966.

Ships built

Over 70 ships, including for the Associated Humber Lines, Darlington, Harrogate and Selby

Footnotes

Defunct shipbuilding companies of Scotland
Manufacturing companies established in 1870
1870 establishments in Scotland
British companies established in 1870